The year 1829 in architecture involved some significant events.

Buildings and structures

Buildings

 The General Post Office building in St Martins-le-Grand in the City of London, designed by Robert Smirke, is completed (replaced c.1912).
 Work begins on the Travellers' Club in London, designed by Charles Barry.
 Hospicio Cabañas in Guadalajara, Mexico, designed by Manuel Tolsá, is completed.
 The new building of the Royal High School, Edinburgh, Scotland on Calton Hill, designed by Thomas Hamilton, is opened.
 Eastern State Penitentiary, Philadelphia, Pennsylvania, designed by John Haviland, is opened.
 Central Congregational Church (Eastport, Maine) is built.
 St Peter's Church, Hammersmith, London, designed by Edward Lapidge, is consecrated.
 The Oratory, Liverpool, England, designed by John Foster, is built.

 Construction of the National Monument of Scotland in Edinburgh, designed by Charles Robert Cockerell and William Henry Playfair, is abandoned due to funds being exhausted, leaving only a row of Doric columns supporting the entablature.
 Cromer Hall in England, designed by William Donthorne, is built.
 Octagon House (Columbus, Georgia) is built.
 Sferisterio di Macerata in Italy, designed by Ireneo Aleandri, is completed.
 Construction of Cisternoni of Livorno in Italy, designed by Pasquale Poccianti, begins (completed 1848).
 Kvitsøy Lighthouse in Norway is built.
 Carrollton Viaduct on the Baltimore and Ohio Railroad, designed by James Lloyd, is completed.

Awards
 Grand Prix de Rome, architecture: Simon-Claude Constant-Dufeux.

Births
 February 8 – Joseph Auguste Émile Vaudremer, French architect (died 1914)
 March 4 – Hermann Ende, German architect (died 1907)
 March 6 – Arthur Blomfield, English architect (died 1899)
 June 18 – Edmund George Lind, English-born American architect (died 1909)
Charles Babcock, American architect (died 1913)
 George Corson, Scottish-born architect working in Leeds (died 1910)
 William Henry Lynn, Irish architect (died 1915)
 William Martin, English architect working in Birmingham (died 1900)

Deaths
 March 14 – Francis Johnston, Irish architect (born 1760)
 March 29 – Thomas Harrison, English architect and bridge engineer (born 1744)
 November 1 – George Allen Underwood, English architect working in Cheltenham (born 1793)

References

Architecture
Years in architecture
19th-century architecture